Knoxville is an unincorporated community in Napa County, California. It lies at an elevation of 1322 feet (403 m).

The Knoxville post office opened in 1863, moved in 1904 and 1907, and closed permanently in 1912. The name commemorates Ranar B. Knox, owner of a local mine and first post master.

References

Unincorporated communities in Napa County, California
Vaca Mountains
Unincorporated communities in California